The Mowat Cup is emblematic of the Junior "A" ice hockey Championship of British Columbia (BC). The winner of the Mowat Cup historically moved on to play the winner of Alberta's Carling O'Keefe Cup for the Doyle Cup, signifying the Canadian Pacific Regions champion.

The Mowat Cup was donated to the British Columbia Amateur Hockey Association by Mr. John Mowat of Victoria, BC, for competition in the 1927-28 hockey season.

In past years, junior teams in BC played in various regional leagues, including the Kootenay International Junior Hockey League, Pacific Coast Junior Hockey League, Peace Cariboo Junior Hockey League  and Rocky Mountain Junior Hockey League.  Various formats for Mowat Cup competition usually saw the champions of these regional leagues compete for the Mowat Cup.

Since 1999, the Mowat Cup has been exclusive to the province-wide Junior "A" British Columbia Hockey League (BCHL). As the BCHL already awarded the Fred Page Cup to its league champions, the BCHL champions were technically also the Mowat Cup champions; the league stopped using this joint Cups designation as of the 2016–17 season, simply awarding the Fred Page Cup.

History
1927–28 – The first competition for the Cup was limited to a one-game affair, as more ice time was not available. Fernie defeated Ex-King George in Vancouver. Fernie had won the right to play in the final, having defeated Armstrong 17–1, Salmon Arm 16–4, and Revelstoke 7-1

1931–32 – The Trail Smoke Eaters won their first of 22 Mowat Cups over a run of 29 seasons. They defeated Merritt in Trail.

1943–44 – Trail won the Mowat Cup title, then the Western Canada finals, only to be defeated by the Oshawa Generals for the National Championship

1961–62 – Marked the initial year of the Okanagan-Mainline Junior "A" Hockey League and as their champions the Kamloops Rockets defeated the Trail Smoke Eaters in two straight games for the title.

1962–63 – Saw the last Mowat Cup victory for the Trail Smoke Eaters, at that time the champions of the Kootenay Junior Hockey League, as they defeated the New Westminster Royals of the Pacific Coast Junior Hockey League.

1967–68 – The British Columbia Junior A Hockey League (BCJHL) was formed when New Westminster Royals and Victoria Cougars of the Pacific Coast Junior Hockey League joined the four team Okanagan Junior Hockey League. The Penticton Broncos won the Mowat Cup in that first year.

1980–81 – Marked the inaugural season in which the BCJHL played the Peace Cariboo Junior Hockey League for the Mowat Cup. The Penticton Knights (BCJHL) defeated the Prince George Spruce Kings (PCJHL) two straight in the best of three, 3-0 and 5–1.

1985–86 – The Penticton Knights became the first ever B.C. team to win the National Title as they defeated Prince George for the Mowat Cup, Calgary for the Doyle Cup, Winnipeg for the Abbott Cup and then won the Centennial Cup Tournament with a final win over host Cole Harbour.

1986–87 – The Richmond Sockeyes followed the Penticton lead defeating Quesnel Millionaires (PCJHL)  for the Mowat Cup', Red Deer Rustlers (AJHL)for the Doyle Cup, Humboldt Broncos for the Abbott Cup and winning the Centennial Cup with a final win over host Humboldt.

1987–88 – The Vernon Lakers (BCJHL) defeated the Grande Prairie North Stars (PCJHL) 2–0 in best-of-three Mowat Cup. The Lakers then went on to beat the Red Deer Rustlers in the Doyle Cup (AJHL 4-2) and Humboldt Broncos (SJHL 4-2) in the Abbott Cup, the last true Western Canadian Junior A Championship. Vernon advanced to the Centennial Cup where they went 0–3, losing to the (eventual champion) Thunder Bay Flyers, Moncton Hawks and host Summerside (PEI) Capitals.

1989–90 – The Series was changed to the best of five for the first time. The New Westminster Royals (BCJHL) defeated Prince George Spruce Kings(PCJHL) in three straight.7-4, 8–5, 7–4. In the Centennial Cup, hosted by Vernon, the Vernon Lakers defeated New Westminster for the National Title with a come-from-behind 6–5 overtime win.

1991–92 – The Vernon Lakers (BCJHL) defeated Prince George Spruce Kings of the newly formed Rocky Mountain Junior Hockey League in three straight. 5–1,7-5 and 5–2, for the 4th in five years.

1999 – the Mowat Cup becomes exclusive to the province-wide Junior "A" British Columbia Hockey League (BCHL)

1999–2016 – the BCHL, by default, grants the Mowat Cup to its Fred Page Cup league champions

2017 – the BCHL retires the Mowatt Cup

Champions
1928  Fernie (Roy Kirkpatrick)
1929  Nelson (Maple Leafs ??)
1930  King George of the Vancouver City Amateur Hockey League 
1931  Ex-King George, Vancouver 
1932  Trail Smoke Eaters, (R.E. Wilson)
1933  Trail Smoke Eaters, (William 'Scotty' Ross)
1934  Trail Smoke Eaters, (William 'Scotty' Ross) 
1935  King George of the Vancouver City Amateur Hockey League 
1936  Trail Smoke Eaters (Steve Matovich) 
1937  Trail Smoke Eaters (Steve Matovich) 
1938  Trail Smoke Eaters (Steve Matovich) 
1939  Trail Smoke Eaters (William 'Scotty' Ross) 
1940  Trail Smoke Eaters (William 'Scotty' Ross) 
1941  No Competition 
1942  No Competition 
1943  Trail Smoke Eaters (Gerry Thompson) 
1944  Trail Smoke Eaters (Gerry Thompson)
1945  No Competition 
1946  Nanaimo Clippers (Walter 'Bus' Matthews) 
1947  Trail Jr. Smoke Eaters (Gerry Thomson) 
1948  Trail Jr. Smoke Eaters (Hedley Marshall) 
1949  Trail Jr. Smoke Eaters (Jimmy Anderson) 
1950  Trail Jr. Smoke Eaters (Jimmy Anderson) 
1951  Trail Jr. Smoke Eaters (Ron Gardiner) 
1952  Trail Jr. Smoke Eaters (Jimmy Anderson) 
1953  Vernon Juniors (Bud Anderson) 
1954  Trail Jr. Smoke Eaters (Robert Milne) 
1955  Trail Jr. Smoke Eaters (Leo Soligo) 
1956  Vernon Juniors (Sarge Sammartino) 
1957  Trail Jr. Smoke Eaters (Jimmy Mailey) 
1958  Warfield Juniors (Robert Clements) 
1959  Trail Jr. Smoke Eaters (Robert Clements) 
1960  Penticton Vees(Bernie Bathgate) 
1961  Trail Smoke Eaters (Ray Hamilton) 
1962  Kamloops Rockets (Kenny Stewart) (BCJHL) 
1963  Trail Smoke Eaters (Ray Hamilton) 
1964  Kamloops Rockets (Kenny Stewart)(BCJHL) 
1965  New Westminster Royals (Robert Bob Fenton) 
1966  New Westminster Royals (Robert Bob Fenton) 
1967  New Westminster Royals (Robert "Bob" Fenton) 
1968  Penticton Broncos (Jack Taggert) 
1969  Victoria Cougars (Doug Anderson) 
1970  Vernon Essos (Oddie Lowe) 
1971  Kamloops Rockets (Joe Tennant) 
1972  Vernon Essos (Oddie Lowe) 
1973  Penticton Broncos (Don Slater) 
1974  Bellingham Blazers (Lawrence Gingras) 
1976  Nor Wes Caps (Pac A)(Brian Crowe) 
1977  Richmond Sockeyes (Pac A)(J. Henderson) 
1978  Merritt Centennials (Joe Tennant) 
1979  Richmond Sockeyes (Pac A)(J. Wild, D. Purdy) 
1980  Penticton Knights (Marc Pezzin) 
1981  Penticton Knights (Marc Pezzin) 
1982  Penticton Knights (Marc Pezzin) 
1983  Abbotsford Flyers (Don Berry, John Olver) 
1984  Langley Eagles (John Olver, P. Logan) 
1985  Penticton Knights (Rick Kozuback, N. Iannone) 
1986  Penticton Knights (Rick Kozuback, N. Iannone) (CENTENNIAL CUP CHAMPIONS OF CANADA) 
1987  Richmond Sockeyes (Orland Kurtenbach) (CENTENNIAL CUP CHAMPIONS OF CANADA)  
1988  Vernon Lakers (Ernie Gare, George Fargher) 
1989  Vernon Lakers (Ernie Gare, Ed Johnstone) 
1990  New Westminster Royals (John Olver, D. Pisiak, V. Lemire, Harvey Smyl) 
1991  Vernon Lakers (Ed Johnstone, Keith Chase) (CENTENNIAL CUP CHAMPIONS OF CANADA)  
1992  Vernon Lakers (Ed Johnstone, Phil Esposito) 
1993  Kelowna Spartans (Jim Hammett) (CENTENNIAL CUP CHAMPIONS OF CANADA) 
1994  Kelowna Spartans (Jim Hammett) 
1995  Chilliwack Chiefs (Harvey Smyl) 
1996  Vernon Vipers (Rob Bremner, Troy Mick) (ROYAL BANK CUP CHAMPIONS OF CANADA) 
1997  South Surrey Eagles (Rick Lanz, J. Short, Mark Holick) 
1998  South Surrey Eagles (Mark Holick, J. Short) (ROYAL BANK CUP CHAMPIONS OF CANADA) 
1999  Vernon Vipers (Troy Mick, Joe Oliver) (ROYAL BANK CUP CHAMPIONS OF CANADA) 
2000  Chilliwack Chiefs (Harvey Smyl)  
2001  Victoria Salsa (Cambell Blair, J. Lund, J. Read) 
2002  Chilliwack Chiefs (Harvey Smyl) 
2003  Vernon Vipers (Mike Vandecamp, Bob Dever, Shawn Bourgeios)
2004  Nanaimo Clippers (Bill Bestwick)
2005  Surrey Eagles (Rick Hillier)
2006  Burnaby Express (Rick Lanz, Bobby Vermette, Dave McLellan, Kolin Kriitmaa) (ROYAL BANK CUP CHAMPIONS OF CANADA) 
2007  Nanaimo Clippers (Bill Bestwick)
2008  Penticton Vees (Fred Harbinson)
2009  Vernon Vipers (Mark Ferner, Jason Williamson)
2010  Vernon Vipers
2011  Vernon Vipers
2012  Penticton Vees (ROYAL BANK CUP CHAMPIONS OF CANADA)
2013  Surrey Eagles
2014  Coquitlam Express
2015  Penticton Vees
2016  West Kelowna Warriors (ROYAL BANK CUP CHAMPIONS OF CANADA)

References

Canadian Junior Hockey League trophies and awards
Ice hockey in British Columbia
British Columbia Hockey League
1928 establishments in British Columbia